Databus may refer to:
 Bus (computing), a communication system that transfers data between different components in a computer or between different computers
 Memory bus, a bus between the computer and the memory
 PCI bus, a bus between motherboard and peripherals that uses the Peripheral Component Interconnect standard
 USB (Universal Serial Bus), a standard communication protocol used by many portable devices, computer peripherals and storage media
 Programming Language for Business, a business-oriented programming language originally called DATABUS
 the Databus project from DBpedia